The Myrtle Fern is a historic apartment building located at Indianapolis, Indiana.  It was built in 1925, and is a two-story, three bay by eleven bay, center-scored, salt-glazed brown brick building on a raised basement. It recessed central entrance bay and segmental arched openings.

It was listed on the National Register of Historic Places in 1983.

References

External links

Apartment buildings in Indiana
Residential buildings on the National Register of Historic Places in Indiana
Residential buildings completed in 1925
Residential buildings in Indianapolis
National Register of Historic Places in Indianapolis